Nausori International Airport ,  also known as Luvuluvu, is the secondary international airport in Fiji, behind Nadi International Airport. It is situated in Nausori on the south-eastern side of Viti Levu (Fiji's main island). Nausori Airport is roughly 23 km (45 minute drive) from Fiji's capital city, Suva. It was first constructed by U.S. Navy Seabees in 1942.

A 20-year Master Plan is being drafted for Nausori Airport that will include a complete refurbishment and upgrade of Fiji's second international airport, creating a facility for the international passengers and a domestic hub for Fiji.

At one time Air Pacific (now Fiji Airways) had its headquarters on the property of the airport.A $60 million project to extend and widen the runway to 2148m was completed in 2021.

Airlines and destinations

References

External links

Nausori International Airport (some information on Nadi official site)
Fiji Airways (official site)

Airports in Fiji